Scan-Optics LLC, founded in 1968, is an enterprise content management services company and optical character recognition (OCR) and image scanner manufacturer headquartered in Manchester, Connecticut.

Scan-Optics' records management, information, data remanence, data backup and data recovery services are supplied to government and business customers throughout North America  and Europe, while its industrial high-speed digital imaging and OCR SO-series scanners are being used worldwide.

History and technology 
Scan-Optics was founded in 1968 by four Connecticut men with financial backing from The Travelers Companies. Its goal of developing the brand-new and barely functioning optical character recognition (OCR) technology. Scan-Optics was one of the technology groups enabling the transition from paper to digital.

Scan-Optics developed the image dissector tube and made it commercially available, pioneered an alphanumeric handwriting recognition system, and introduced key data entry integrated with optical character recognition via a direct computer-to-computer link to accomplish image reject repair. In a 1997 study Doculabs classified Scan-Optics' intelligent character recognition (ICR) as "a significant improvement over standard ICR technology" - in tests using 3,400 forms completed from a national sample of the general population, only Scan-Optics' ICR technology yielded a field read rate accuracy of approximately 90%. In recent years, Scan-Optics' developments included acoustic double page detection, context edit, the integration of magnetic ink character recognition (MICR) and barcode reading into the recognition system and the introduction of grayscale capability in OCR.

References

Further reading 

 Computerworld Article "OCR Proves Logical Choice for Tallying Proxies", page 21, Aug 31, 1981
 Hartford Courant News Profile of Scan-Optics, February 09, 1998
 ACBJ Business Journals article "Scan Optics Chooses Brainware Distiller to Help Process Millions of Pages Daily", March 16, 2010
 ISM news article "Scan-Optics Offers 200 Page Per Minute Production Image Scanner", May 07, 2002
 BSM article "Scan-Optics Ranks In Connecticut's 25 Best Performing Public Companies", June 21, 2004
 EMC article "Digital Legal Standardizes On Scan-Optics For High-Volume Scanning Solution", January 19, 2006

Storage companies
Electronics companies of the United States
Companies based in Manchester, Connecticut
Electronics companies established in 1968
Computer storage companies
Cloud storage
1968 establishments in Connecticut